Wheeler Township may refer to the following places:

 Wheeler Township, Van Buren County, Arkansas
 Wheeler Township, Washington County, Arkansas
 Wheeler Township, Lyon County, Iowa
 Wheeler Township, Sac County, Iowa
 Wheeler Township, Gratiot County, Michigan
 Wheeler Township, Lake of the Woods County, Minnesota

See also 
Wheeler (disambiguation)

Township name disambiguation pages